Amazônia is the twenty-first studio album by French musician and composer Jean-Michel Jarre, released on 9 April 2021 by Columbia Records.

Background
The album serves as the 52-minute musical score for the exhibition Amazônia, a project by photographer and filmmaker Sebastião Salgado presented from May to October 2021 in the Paris Philharmonic complex. Jarre had access to the Museum of Ethnology in the city of Geneva, Switzerland. 

The exhibition focuses on the Brazilian Amazon, featuring more than 200 photographs and other media by Salgado. In this album, a combination of electronic and orchestral instruments was made, natural sounds were also used. As well as a standard stereo version released on CD and LP, a binaural version and a 5.1 surround sound version were made available in digital download.

A remark in the CD booklet/on the LP cover states that a part of the royalties will be returned to the Indigenous communities where the recordings were made. It is however unclear how this will be achieved.

Track listing

Personnel
Adapted from album booklet:
 Jean-Michel Jarre – production, mixing
 Patrick Pelamourgues – technical assistance
 David Perreau – mastering
 Sebastião Salgado – Amazônia photographs
 Gong Li – Jean-Michel Jarre portrait
 Renato Amoroso – Sebastião Salgado portrait
 Eric BDFCK Cornic – graphic design

Charts

References

2021 albums
Jean-Michel Jarre albums